This is a list of football teams based in the English county of Shropshire sorted by which domestic league they currently compete in. The leagues are listed in order of their level in the English football league system. The list only features teams from the 1st to the 10th tier of the system.

Levels 1–4

These clubs compete in fully professional leagues, comprising levels 1–4 of the English football league system: the Premier League and the English Football League.

Levels 5–10

These clubs compete in semi-professional leagues, comprising levels 5–10 of the English football league system: the National League downwards.

Other national leagues
These clubs are based in Shropshire, but compete in the Cymru Premier, the national league of Wales.

References

Shropshire
Shropshire